Line 7 of Wuhan Metro is a metro line in Wuhan. The line runs from  station in Huangpi District to  station in Jiangxia District.

Opening timeline

Stations

References

 
2018 establishments in China
Railway lines opened in 2018